The 1988 1000 km di Monza was the third round of the 1988 World Sportscar Championship season.  It took place at the Autodromo Nazionale Monza, Italy on April 10, 1988.

Official results
Class winners in bold.  Cars failing to complete 75% of the winner's distance marked as Not Classified (NC).

Statistics
 Pole Position - #61 Team Sauber Mercedes - 1:31.690
 Fastest Lap - #61 Team Sauber Mercedes - 1:35.750
 Average Speed - 206.019 km/h

References

 

M
6 Hours of Monza
Monza 1000